The 5P-42 Filin (eagle owl), is a Russian electro-optic countermeasure system developed by Roselectronics for the Russian Armed Forces. The system is designed to disrupt enemy's combatants eyesight at night and preventing them from targeting a protected platform. Besides that, it is also capable to suppress night vision devices, laser rangefinders, anti-tank missile and other electro-optical sight systems. It was first unveiled in December 2018, and its naval version is currently being deployed at the Admiral Gorshkov-class frigates.

Design
The 5P-42 Filin creates a powerful beam of light, similar to the strobe-like effect, preventing enemy soldiers from aiming and targeting protected platforms, especially if they are using guns. During tests, volunteers reported having trouble to reach their target when using rifles and guns to shoot targets that were protected by the system, because they couldn't see. Additionally, about half of the volunteers said they felt dizzy, nauseous and disoriented and about 20 percent of the volunteers reported experiencing hallucinations. The effective range of the system is  while its impact angle is 10-15 degrees.

The system is intended for use with the Navy, Army and possibly also with law enforcement and national guard units of Russia.

Operational history
In February 2019, Russian  and  frigates became the first to use the countermeasure, each frigate was fitted with two 5P-42 Filin stations.

Operators

 Russian Navy

References

Electronic countermeasures
Non-lethal weapons
Military electronics of Russia